, initials of  is a Japanese manufacturer dealing in cosmetics and health food supplements headquartered in Tokyo, Japan. It was established in 1972. Their flagship brand name is "Olive Virgin Oil".

Originally started in Japan as a translation business, DHC Corporation ventured into other enterprises and is now a leading manufacturer of cosmetics, vitamins, healthy foods, and lingerie. In addition to these ventures, DHC Corporation has an educational and publishing department, hotel and spa, and two aesthetic salons. It is also a minor shareholder in the music chart operator Oricon Inc. and a parent company to JFL affiliate station Cross FM. It started a helicopter business in 2008.

Models appearing in DHC TV commercials
Akihiro Miwa
Chisato Moritaka
Erika Yamakawa
Im Jin-ah
Kano sisters
Maho Honda
Naomi Hosokawa
Nanako Fujisaki
Suzuko Irie
Yoshihiro Akiyama
Yoon Eun Hye

Sponsored sporting events
LBO Ladies Bowling Tour
Sagan Tosu football club (on shirts)
 IFBA (International Federation of Broomball Associations) World Broomball Championships, Tomokomai, Japan (November 2014)  Platinum tournament sponsor and sponsor of the Japanese broomball Team (Team Red, Team White in the Men's division), Japanese ladies broomball team, Japanese mixed broomball team and the Japanese masters' broomball team.

Racial statements by CEO and withdrawal from Korea
In 2020 and 2021, CEO Yoshiaki Yoshida made statements promoting DHC's employment of "pure Japanese" employees and models, in contrast to competitors' employment of people with Korean heritage.  This has generated backlash and was followed by the company's exit from South Korea at the end of 2021.

Yoshida has made remarks about Koreans deemed offensive. He accused South Koreans of "チョン" on DHC's official Instagram, considerd a racist word about Koreans. On April 9, 2021, he said, "Korean race is easy to recognize because of its characteristic name, protruding jaw shape, narrow mouth, and above all, the back of the head is a cliff".

References

External links
Official websites:
Japan
United States
France
Korea

Japanese companies established in 1972
Manufacturing companies established in 1972
Personal care brands
Cosmetics companies of Japan
Cosmetics brands
Manufacturing companies based in Tokyo
Food and drink companies based in Tokyo
Anti-South Korean sentiment in Japan
Japanese brands